David Johnson, a former £9 a week bank clerk who became a multi-millionaire in the finance industry, was a  hugely successful British thoroughbred racehorse owner whose Comply or Die ridden by Timmy Murphy and trained by David Pipe  was the winner of the 2008 John Smith's Grand National at Aintree Racecourse, run on Saturday 5 April 2008. The following week he announced a major restructuring of his deployment of horses. David Johnson died of cancer at the age of 67 on 6 July 2013 and was an inspiration to many.

References

British racehorse owners and breeders
1940s births
Place of birth missing
2013 deaths